Henley is a constituency in Oxfordshire represented in the House of Commons of the UK Parliament since 2008 by John Howell, a Member of Parliament from the Conservative Party. He was elected in a by-election following the resignation of future Prime Minister Boris Johnson, who had taken office as Mayor of London. The constituency was established for the 1885 general election.

Constituency profile
The seat has throughout its history consisted of the town of Henley and a well-connected part of the Chiltern Hills AONB interspersed by the larger settlements of Thame and Chinnor and a narrow more developed area adjoining the Thames on one bank. The local economy, interconnected with London, Oxford and in the far south Reading, ensures a high rate of employment and its natural environment attracts retirees and high income owners. The seat has good rail connections to Central London. As of 2021, the largest town in the constituency is Thame.

History 
Two prominent Cabinet ministers have been elected for Henley — Michael Heseltine who served as the MP for Henley from 1974–2001. Heseltine was succeeded by the future Mayor of London and Prime Minister Boris Johnson, rapidly made a shadow minister during the period of the Labour government.  In May 2008, Johnson was elected as Mayor of London, and he subsequently resigned from the Commons on 4 June 2008, resulting in a by-election in the constituency.

 Political history

An unbroken succession of Conservative candidates have won the seat since 1910. The 2008 by-election was closer than general elections since 2001 and won by the Conservative candidate, John Howell. Howell was re-elected at the 2010 general election and again in 2015. Labour finished second for the first time since 1970 in Henley. The 2015 GE result made the seat the twelfth safest of the Conservative Party's 331 seats by percentage of majority.

 Other parties

All five parties' candidates achieved more than deposit-retaining threshold of 5% of the vote in 2015, reflecting frequent such results for the Green Party and UKIP in that election. Liberal Democrat or predecessor-party Liberal candidates were second-placed between February 1974 and 2010 (inclusive). The closest contest for Henley was in 1966, when Labour's George Cunningham took 44.6% of the vote in a two-candidate contest.

 Turnout

At general elections, turnout in the constituency has ranged between 52.9% in the "khaki election" of 1918 to 81.7% in 1950.

Boundaries and boundary changes

1885–1918: The constituency was formed under the Redistribution of Seats Act 1885 as the Southern or Henley Division of Oxfordshire when the three-member Parliamentary County of Oxfordshire was divided into the three single-member constituencies of Banbury, Woodstock and Henley. It comprised the Municipal Borough of Henley-on-Thames, the Sessional Divisions of Henley and Wallington, part of the Sessional Division of Bullingdon and the part of the Municipal Borough of Abingdon in the county of Oxfordshire.

1918–1950: The Municipal Borough of Henley-on-Thames, the Urban Districts of Bicester, Thame, Wheatley, as well as the Rural Districts of Bicester, Crowmarsh, Culham, Goring, Headington, Henley, Thame.

Expanded to include eastern half of the abolished Woodstock Division, including Bicester. Caversham, which had been absorbed by the County Borough of Reading, transferred to the Parliamentary Borough of Reading in Berkshire.

1950–1974: The Municipal Borough of Henley-on-Thames, the Urban Districts of Bicester and Thame, the Rural Districts of Bullingdon and Henley and part of the Rural District of Ploughley.

Change to contents due to reorganisation of urban and rural districts. Minor losses to the Oxford constituency, including Cowley and Headington, as a result of the expansion of the County Borough of Oxford.

1974–1983: The Municipal Borough of Henley-on-Thames, the Urban District of Thame, the Rural District of Henley and part of the Rural District of Bullingdon.

Bicester and northern parts of Rural District of Ploughley transferred to Banbury. Southern parts of the Rural District of Ploughley and northernmost parts of the Rural District of Bullingdon included in the new County Constituency of Mid-Oxon.

1983–1997: The District of South Oxfordshire wards of Aston Rowant, Benson, Berinsfield, Chalgrove, Chinnor, Clifton Hampden, Crowmarsh, Dorchester, Forest Hill, Garsington, Goring, Goring Heath, Great Milton, Henley, Kidmore End, Nettlebed, Rotherfield Peppard, Shiplake, Sonning Common, Thame North, Thame South, Watlington, Wheatley, and Woodcote.

Gained the rural area to the east of Oxford from the abolished County Constituency of Mid-Oxon.  The Littlemore ward to the south of Oxford was included in the new Borough Constituency of Oxford East.

1997–2010: As above plus Horspath.

Minor gain from Oxford East.

2010–present: The District of South Oxfordshire wards of Aston Rowant, Benson, Berinsfield, Chalgrove, Chilton Woods, Chinnor, Clifton Hampden, Crowmarsh, Forest Hill, Garsington, Goring, Great Milton, Henley North, Henley South, Kidmore End, Nettlebed, Rotherfield Peppard, Shiplake, Sonning Common, Thame North, Thame South, Watlington, Wheatley, and Woodcote, and two District of Cherwell wards of Fringford & Heyfords and Launton & Otmoor.

The two wards of [Fringford & Heyfords] and [Launton & Otmoor] in the District of Cherwell, to the south of Bicester, were transferred from Banbury.

The constituency covers most of the local government district of South Oxfordshire, excluding Wallingford, Didcot and surroundings in the west. Main settlements include Henley-on-Thames itself, Thame, Chinnor and Sonning Common. The two wards of Cherwell are to the north, close to Oxford; they are predominantly rural.

Members of Parliament

Elections

Elections in the 2010s

Elections in the 2000s

:

:

Elections in the 1990s

Elections in the 1980s

Elections in the 1970s

Elections in the 1960s

Elections in the 1950s

Elections in the 1940s

Elections in the 1930s

Elections in the 1920s

Elections in the 1910s

Elections in the 1900s

Elections in the 1890s

Elections in the 1880s

Neighbouring constituencies

See also 
 List of parliamentary constituencies in Oxfordshire
 Boundary Commission for England
 Fifth Periodic Review of Westminster constituencies
 First-past-the-post voting
 History of local government in England
 Rural districts
 Urban districts
 Homogeneity

Notes

References

Sources 

Parliamentary constituencies in Oxfordshire
Henley-on-Thames
Constituencies of the Parliament of the United Kingdom established in 1885
Boris Johnson